Marise Kruger (born 17 July 1958) is a former South African tennis player who was active in the second half of the 1970s.

Tennis career
Kruger started playing tennis when she was five. She reached the girl's final at the 1976 Wimbledon Championships, won the junior singles title at the 1976 US Open, and won the singles title at the junior Orange Bowl tournament in December 1976.

In June 1976, Kruger was runner-up at the Kent Championships in Beckenham, losing in three sets to Olga Morozova. In the preceding weeks, she had won tournament titles in Guildford and Chichester. In August that year, she won the South Orange Open singles title beating Lea Antonoplis. In May 1977, she won the doubles title at the Italian Open, partnering compatriot Brigitte Cuypers, and in August, she was a finalist at Canadian Open in Toronto, losing the final in three sets to Regina Maršíková. She partnered with Dianne Fromholtz to win the 1979 Austrian Open doubles, and they reached the semifinals of the doubles at the 1979 French Open.

In 1978, Kruger was a member of the San Francisco Golden Gaters in World Team Tennis (WTT).

Her best singles result at a Grand Slam tournament was reaching the quarterfinals at the 1978 Wimbledon Championships, in which she lost to second-seeded and eventual champion Martina Navratilova.

Career finals

Singles: 4 (2 titles, 2 runner-ups)

Doubles: 1 (1 title)

References

External links
 
 

South African female tennis players
1958 births
Living people
Sportspeople from Pretoria
Grand Slam (tennis) champions in girls' singles
US Open (tennis) junior champions
White South African people